Coccivora is a genus of minute pirate bugs in the family Anthocoridae. There is one described species in Coccivora, C. californica.

References

Further reading

 
 

Anthocorini
Articles created by Qbugbot